Adı Bende Saklı is the 15th studio album recorded by Turkish singer, songwriter and producer Sezen Aksu. It was released on December 20, 1998, through Universal Music. The album was produced by Levent Semerci.

Background 
The title track of the album is the eighth song, "Adı Bende Saklı". It is composed by the Greek composer Yannis Karalis'. The original composition is called "ECLIPSE (instrumental from album ODYSSEY - international release – July 1997)". The Turkish lyrics were written by Sezen Aksu and late Meral Okay, one of her best and longest lasting friends. The song has been the topic of many controversies. Sezen Aksu's version of the song is the original music of "ECLIPSE" in its entirety which was copied without Yannis Karalis consent or FM RECORDS's legal consent (authorization) the second being the owner of the master recording. As soon as the original composer was informed about the violation of his copy-rights, he filed a lawsuit and the Court ruled against the infringers who appealed this case.

The lawsuit is still on-going to the Supreme Court. 

Three songs from the album had videos: "Tutuklu", "Adı Bende Saklı" and "Ruhuma Asla". The album received critical acclaim by many and is also seen as a benchmark 1990s Turkish pop music album.

Track listing 
  "Ud Taksimi" (0:57)
 "Tutuklu" (4:25) (lyrics – music: Sezen Aksu, arrangement: Kıvanç K.)
  "Kaderim" (4:06)(lyrics – music: Sezen Aksu, arrangement: Kıvanç K.)
  "Hazan" (5:41) (lyrics – music: Sezen Aksu, arrangement: Aykut Gürel)
 "Erkek Güzeli" (4:06) (lyrics – music: Sezen Aksu, arrangement: Murat Yeter)
  "Kusura Bakma" (1976) (4:16) (lyrics – music: Sezen Aksu, arrangement: Murat Yeter)
 "Ruhuma Asla" (4:58) (lyrics – music: Sezen Aksu)
  "Adı Bende Saklı" (3:46) (lyrics: Meral Okay, Sezen Aksu, music: Yannis Karalis)
 "Ben Sevdalı Sen Belalı" (5:26) (lyrics – music: Selami Şahin, arrangement: Garo Mafyan)
  "Şimal Yıldızı" (5:12) (lyrics: Sezen Aksu, Meral Okay, music: Sezen Aksu, arrangement: Aşkın Arsunan)
  "Yola Çıkmalı" (4:09) (lyrics – music: Sezen Aksu, arrangement: Aykut Gürel)
 "İnce Mevzu" (4:17) (lyrics: Mustafa Sandal, Sezen Aksu, music – arrangement: Mustafa Sandal)
 "Denge" (4:59) (lyrics: Turgut Uyar, music: Sezen Aksu, Aykut Gürel, arrangement: Aykut Gürel)
  "Adı Menekşe" (4:53) (lyrics: Meral Okay, Sezen Aksu, music: Sezen Aksu, Aşkın Arsunan, arrangement: Kıvanç K.), CD Bonus
 "Ruhuma Asla" (5:06) (lyrics – music: Sezen Aksu), CD Bonus

References

External links 
 SezenAksu.com.tr

1998 albums
Sezen Aksu albums